Trayan Kolev Dyankov (21 June 1976 – 1 August 2016) was a Bulgarian football defender and manager of Spartak Varna. He was a right or central defender, and began his career in Spartak Varna's youth teams.

Career
Born in Varna, Dyankov started to play football in the local club Spartak Varna. He made his first-team debut on 10 April 1994 in an A PFG match against Slavia Sofia as an 86th-minute substitute.

After that played in Velbazhd Kyustendil and Lokomotiv Plovdiv. During the 2003/04 season he won the top Bulgarian league, the A PFG, with Loko Plovdiv.

In June 2006, Dyankov joined Chernomorets Burgas. With the club he played in the matches of Intertoto Cup 2008 against Slovenian ND Gorica and Swiss Grasshopper Club Zürich. On 15 January 2011, it was announced that Chernomorets had renewed the contract of Dyankov, extending it until 30 June 2012.

Personal life
Dyankov married in 2009. He died at the age of 40 on 1 August 2016 in Varna after suffering a suspected heart attack while exercising.

Honours
PFC Lokomotiv Plovdiv
 Champion of Bulgaria: 2004 
 Bulgarian Supercup: 2004

References

1976 births
2016 deaths
Bulgarian footballers
First Professional Football League (Bulgaria) players
PFC Spartak Varna players
PFC Velbazhd Kyustendil players
PFC Lokomotiv Plovdiv players
PFC Chernomorets Burgas players
PFC Kaliakra Kavarna players
Association football defenders
FC Spartak Varna managers
Bulgarian football managers
FC Dynamo Makhachkala players